Saint Filarete of Calabria (also the gardener) (c. 1020 – 1070) he was born in Palermo in 1020, into a family of Calabrian origin deported to Sicily by the Saracens, and subsequently released. Back in Calabria in 1040, Filarete lived in Reggio Calabria and then moved to the monastery of St. Elias stood on Mount Aulinas at Palmi. Later also lived in Sinopoli and then return to Monte Aulinas under the guidance of Orestes, where he spent the last 25 years of his life.

References
 , Filarète di Calabria, santo, Enciclopedia Treccani 

People from the Province of Reggio Calabria
Religious leaders from Palermo
Sicilian saints
Palmi
11th-century Christian saints
1020s births
1070 deaths
Religious leaders from the Province of Palermo